The 1989 Lafayette Leopards football team was an American football team that represented Lafayette College during the 1989 NCAA Division I-AA football season. Lafayette tied for second in the Colonial League.

In their ninth year under head coach Bill Russo, the Leopards compiled a 4–7 record. Frank Baur and Dwayne Norris were the team captains.

The Leopards outscored opponents 319 to 249. Lafayette's 2–2 conference record tied for second in the five-team Colonial League standings.

Lafayette played its home games at Fisher Field on College Hill in Easton, Pennsylvania.

Schedule

References

Lafayette
Lafayette Leopards football seasons
Lafayette Leopards football